Drummond is an unincorporated community in northwestern New Brunswick, Canada. It held village status prior to 2023.

It is located in rolling farmland approximately 5 kilometres southeast of Grand Falls, of which it is administratively a part. Drummond's economy is centred on the potato industry, and  cereal crops such as wheat, barley and oats are grown mainly through crop rotation. More than 50% of the potatoes grown are sold for processing to McCain Foods Limited, and 45% are grown as seed potatoes for inter-provincial and international export.

History

The village was first settled by Irish immigrants in the 1850s. It was named after Gordon Drummond, a major in the British Army. Acadian settlement occurred during the latter half of the 19th century.

On 1 January 2023, Drummond amalgamated with the town of Grand Falls The community's name remains in official use.

Demographics 

Notable people

 Ron Turcotte, who won the Triple Crown of Thoroughbred Racing in 1973, was born in Drummond.

See also
List of communities in New Brunswick
Drummond Parish, New Brunswick

References

External links
 Village de Drummond

Communities in Victoria County, New Brunswick
Former villages in New Brunswick